Sir George Thomas Smart (10 May 1776 – 23 February 1867) was an English musician.

Smart was born in London, his father being a music-seller. He was a choir-boy at the Chapel Royal, and was educated in music, becoming an expert violinist, organist, teacher of singing and conductor. He taught for many years at the Royal Academy of Music where his notable pupils included Elizabeth Greenfield, John Orlando Parry, Mary Shaw, and Willoughby Weiss. In 1811 he was knighted by the Lord Lieutenant of Ireland, having conducted a number of successful concerts in Dublin. On 1 April 1822 he was appointed organist at the Chapel Royal.

From that time onwards, Sir George Smart was one of the chief musical leaders and organizers in England, directing the music for the opening of the Great Exhibition of 1851, conducting at the Royal Philharmonic Society, Covent Garden, the provincial festivals, etc., and in 1838 being appointed composer to the Chapel Royal. He was a master of the Handelian traditions, was personally acquainted with Beethoven and a close friend of Weber, who died in his house. Some of his church music and glees became well-known. He died in London and is buried in Kensal Green Cemetery.

His brother Henry (1778–1823), father of the composers Harriet Anne Smart and Henry Smart, was a well-known violinist.

Smart wrote a journal, Leaves from the Journals of Sir George Smart, that was published in 1907.

References

External links
 Leaves from the Journals of Sir George Smart, on Google Books

1776 births
1867 deaths
English composers
English classical organists
British male organists
Burials at Kensal Green Cemetery
English conductors (music)
British male conductors (music)
Knights Bachelor
Musicians awarded knighthoods
Musicians from London
Chairpersons of the Royal Philharmonic Society
Male classical organists